This is a list of plantations and/or plantation houses in the U.S. state of Virginia that are National Historic Landmarks, listed on the National Register of Historic Places, other historic registers, or are otherwise significant for their history, association with significant events or people, or their architecture and design.

HUTTON PLANTATION 

Edmondson hall - Washington co.

See also

History of slavery in Virginia
List of plantations in the United States

References

Virginia